Pelly Island is an uninhabited island in the Beaufort Sea. It is named for Sir John Pelly, 1st Baronet, the 17th Governor of the Hudson's Bay Company.

References

Uninhabited islands of the Northwest Territories